Norman Bellingham (born December 23, 1964 in Fairfax, Virginia) is an American sprint canoer and Olympic champion who competed from the mid-1980s to the early 1990s.

Background 
Competing in three Summer Olympics, he won gold in the K-2 1000 m event at Seoul in 1988. 
Bellingham was Chief Operating Officer of the United States Olympic Committee from 2006 to 2011. He previously had been employed as Senior Vice President, Strategic Planning of Turner Broadcasting System in Atlanta, a position he held from 2002.

Bellingham attended Richard Montgomery High School and graduated in 1983.
Bellingham is also a graduate of Harvard University where he earned an honors BA in economics in 1993, and ultimately returned in 1998 to earn his MBA.

References 

International Canoe Federation announcement of Bellingham as United States Olympic Committee Chief Operating Officer. - accessed October 10, 2009.

1964 births
Living people
American male canoeists
American referees and umpires
American television executives
Canoeists at the 1984 Summer Olympics
Canoeists at the 1988 Summer Olympics
Canoeists at the 1992 Summer Olympics
Harvard College alumni
Olympic gold medalists for the United States in canoeing
Sportspeople from Atlanta
Sportspeople from Colorado Springs, Colorado
Olympic medalists in canoeing
American chief operating officers
Harvard Business School alumni
Medalists at the 1988 Summer Olympics
Pan American Games gold medalists for the United States
Pan American Games medalists in canoeing
Canoeists at the 1987 Pan American Games
Medalists at the 1987 Pan American Games